Lake Niangua is a  hydroelectric lake in southern Camden County, Missouri, USA, on the Niangua River. The lake has a public access with a boat ramp and picnic area.

History of the Tunnel Dam

In 1911, the cave was then modified so the river flowed through it during dam construction. There is usually no water running between the dam and the lake's powerhouse.

Hydroelectricity

Hydroelectric engineers then placed a powerhouse at the upper end of the tunnel for hydroelectricity. In 1930, the powerhouse was moved to the lower end of the tunnel taking advantage of the  drop. The powerhouse has two turbines. The hydroelectric equipment provides 3 megawatts of power for nearby residents.

Geography of the Lake

The lake is only a few feet deep so larger boats are not able to access this lake. To the north there is a steep ridge that is only a few hundred feet wide, this ridge makes the river go an extra four miles (6 km) between the dam and the powerhouse. The shoreline is almost entirely wooded around the lake.

References 
 https://web.archive.org/web/20030123083246/http://www.mosportsmen.com/lakes/niaganua.htm
 http://www.shomepower.com/about/niangua/

Protected areas of Camden County, Missouri
Reservoirs in Missouri
Buildings and structures in Camden County, Missouri
Bodies of water of Camden County, Missouri